I gabestokken is a 1950 Danish family film directed by Jon Iversen and Alice O'Fredericks.

Cast
 Ove Rud - Viggo Bach
 Grethe Thordahl - Bente Bach
 Paula Illemann Feder - Viggos mor
 Jon Iversen - Kontorchefen
 Lily Broberg - Rita Hansen
 Ib Schønberg - Dr. Svenningsen
 Jørgen Reenberg - Studenten Teddy
 Preben Lerdorff Rye - Revisor Sejr
 Peter Malberg - Gamle
 Rigmor Hvidtfeldt - Magda
 Birthe Backhausen - Gerda
 Betty Helsengreen - Tykke
 Jytte Møller - Susie
 Max Ibenfeldt - Maketenderen
 Paul Møller - Jørgensen
 Lone Luther - Ebba
 Karl Gustav Ahlefeldt - Reservelægen
 Guri Richter - Sygeplejerske
 Marianne Malmquist - Kontorassistent
 Else Jarlbak - Buffetjomfru
 Thecla Boesen - Pensionatsværtsinde

References

External links

1950 films
1950s Danish-language films
Danish black-and-white films
Films directed by Alice O'Fredericks
Films directed by Jon Iversen
Danish drama films
1950 drama films